Santa Rosa District is one of eight districts of the province La Mar in Peru.

Ethnic groups 

The people in the district are mainly indigenous citizens of Quechua descent. Quechua is the language which the majority of the population (65.82%) learnt to speak in childhood, 33.53% of the residents started speaking using the Spanish language (2007 Peru Census).

Type-                                             Populated-a city, town, village, or other agglomeration of buildings where people live and work

Mindat.org Region -                       Ayacucho, Peru

Region-                                          Santa Rosa, Provincia De La Mar, Ayacucho, Peru

Koppen climate type-                     cfb: Temperate Oceanic Climate

References

External Links 
1.https://www.mindat.org/feature-3935759.html